Sherren is a surname. Notable people with the surname include: 

Graham Sherren (born 1937), British publisher
James Sherren (1872–1945), British surgeon
Sherren's triangle, an area of skin hyperaesthesia found in acute appendicitis

See also
Sherrer